Langbeinite is a potassium magnesium sulfate mineral with the chemical formula K2Mg2(SO4)3. Langbeinite crystallizes in the isometric-tetartoidal (cubic) system as transparent colorless or white with pale tints of yellow to green and violet crystalline masses. It has a vitreous luster. The Mohs hardness is 3.5 to 4 and the specific gravity is 2.83. The crystals are piezoelectric.

The mineral is an ore of potassium and occurs in marine evaporite deposits in association with carnallite, halite, and sylvite.

It was first described in 1891 for an occurrence in Wilhelmshall, Halberstadt, Saxony-Anhalt, Germany, and named for A. Langbein of Leopoldshall, Germany.

Langbeinite gives its name to the langbeinites, a family of substances with the same cubic structure, a tetrahedral anion, and large and small cations.

Related substances include hydrated salts leonite (K2Mg(SO4)2·4H2O) and picromerite (K2Mg(SO4)2·6H2O).

References

Sulfate minerals
Evaporite
Cubic minerals
Minerals in space group 198
Minerals described in 1891